The San Diego Seals are a lacrosse team based in San Diego, California. The team plays in the National Lacrosse League (NLL). The 2022 season is their 3rd season in the NLL.

Regular season

Final standings

Game log

Regular season
Reference:

Playoffs

Roster

Entry Draft
The 2021 NLL Entry Draft took place on August 28, 2021. The Seals made the following selections:

See also
2022 NLL season

References

San Diego
San Diego Seals seasons
San Diego Seals